Endotricha borneoensis is a species of snout moth in the genus Endotricha. It was described by George Hampson in 1916, and is known from Borneo (from which its species epithet is derived), the Solomon Islands, New Guinea, and the Malay Archipelago.

References

Moths described in 1916
Endotrichini